Ivy Ruckman (May 25, 1931 – June 8, 2021), formally Iva Mae Myers Ruckman, was an American author of books for children and young adults. Her works include Melba the Brain and Night of the Twisters, inspired by a 1980 tornado event, the latter of which was made into a 1996 movie. Night of the Twisters was a best seller. A graduate of Hastings College, Ruckman lived in Salt Lake City, Utah.

Ivy died on June 8, 2021. She was 90 years old.

References

External links

 
 

1931 births
2021 deaths
American children's writers
American women novelists
American screenwriters
American women screenwriters
20th-century American novelists
Place of birth missing
American women children's writers
20th-century American women writers
21st-century American women